Juan Olivier Simo Kingue (born 20 February 1996), known as Olivier Kingue, is a Cameroonian football player who plays for 1. FK Příbram.

Club career
He made his professional debut in the Segunda Liga for Olhanense on 28 January 2017 in a game against Sporting Covilhã.

References

External links
 

1996 births
Footballers from Yaoundé
Living people
Cameroonian footballers
Cameroonian expatriate footballers
Expatriate footballers in Belgium
S.C. Olhanense players
FK Ústí nad Labem players
1. FK Příbram players
Expatriate footballers in Portugal
Liga Portugal 2 players
Czech National Football League players
Czech First League players
Association football defenders
Cameroonian expatriate sportspeople in the Czech Republic
Expatriate footballers in the Czech Republic